James R. Peterson is a Democratic member of the South Dakota Senate, representing the 4th district since 2005. He is currently Minority Whip. Earlier he was a member of the South Dakota House of Representatives from 2001 through 2004.

External links
South Dakota Legislature – Jim Peterson official SD Senate website

Project Vote Smart – Senator James R. Peterson 'Jim' (SD) profile
Follow the Money – Jim Peterson
2008 2006 2004 Senate campaign contributions
2002 2000 House campaign contributions

South Dakota state senators
Members of the South Dakota House of Representatives
1943 births
Living people
21st-century American politicians